Rebuzzi is a surname. Notable people with the surname include:

Antonella Rebuzzi (1954–2018), Italian politician
Pietro Rebuzzi (1918–?), Italian footballer

Italian-language surnames